VA-104 was an Attack Squadron of the U.S. Navy. It was established as Fighter Squadron VF-104 on 1 May 1952, and redesignated VA-104 in December 1953. The squadron was disestablished on 31 March 1959. Its nickname was Hell's Archers.

Significant events
 Nov 1956: During the Suez War the squadron operated from USS Coral Sea (CVA-43) off the coast of Egypt. It provided air support for the evacuation of Americans and foreign nationals from that country.
 Jul 1958: The squadron operated from USS Forrestal (CVA-59) in the eastern Atlantic, ready to enter the Mediterranean if needed for the U.S. Marines’ landing in Beirut, Lebanon.

Home port assignments
The squadron was assigned to these home ports, effective on the dates shown:
 NAS Cecil Field – 1 May 1952
 NAS Jacksonville – Apr 1953
 NAS Cecil Field – Dec 1953
 NAS Jacksonville – Feb 1957

Aircraft assignment
The squadron first received the following aircraft on the dates shown:
 FG-1D Corsair – May 1952
 F4U-5 Corsair – Dec 1952
 AD-6 Skyraider – 6 Jan 1954

See also
 Attack aircraft
 List of inactive United States Navy aircraft squadrons
 History of the United States Navy

References

Attack squadrons of the United States Navy
Wikipedia articles incorporating text from the Dictionary of American Naval Aviation Squadrons